The Extra Girl is a 1923 American silent comedy film directed by F. Richard Jones and starring Mabel Normand. Produced by Mack Sennett, The Extra Girl followed earlier films about the film industry and also paved the way for later films about Hollywood, such as King Vidor's Show People (1928). It was still unusual in 1923 for filmmakers to make a film about the southern California film industry, then little more than ten years old. Still, many of the Hollywood clichés of small town girls travelling to Hollywood to become film stars are here to reinforce the myths of "Tinseltown".

Plot
Sue Graham (Normand) is a small town girl who travels to Hollywood to escape marriage, and in the hope of becoming a motion picture star. She wins a contract with a studio on the strength of a picture of a quite different (and very attractive) girl sent instead of hers; but when she arrives the mistake is discovered. Since the error was the result of another's deception, the studio manager agrees to give her a job in the costume department. She eventually gets the opportunity to screen test, but it turns out disastrously – although in a nod to the actress behind the character the director calls her "a natural comedian." Sue's parents come out to California, and invest money with a shifty individual who swindles them out of their life savings. Sue and childhood friend Dave, who has also followed her, retrieve the money. Despite the unsuccessful film career, all turns out well.

Cast

 Mabel Normand as Sue Graham
 George Nichols as Zachariah "Pa" Graham
 Anna Dodge as Mary "Ma" Graham (credited as Anna Hernandez)
 Ralph Graves as Dave Giddings
 Vernon Dent as Aaron Applejohn
 Ramsey Wallace as T. Phillip Hackett
 Charlotte Mineau as Belle "Widow" Brown
 Mary Mason as Actress
 Max Davidson as Tailor 
 Louise Carver as Madame McCarthy, Wardrobe Mistress
 Carl Stockdale as Director
 Harry Gribbon as Comedy Director
 George Beranger as Actor in Wardrobe Line (credited as André Beranger)
 Teddy the Dog as Teddy 
 Billy Armstrong as Comedian in Derby (uncredited)
 Duke the Dog as Duke (uncredited)
 Robert Dudley as Financier (uncredited)
 Charles K. French as Studio Manager (uncredited)
 Numa the Lion as Numa (uncredited)
 Jackie Lucas as Son (uncredited)
 Eric Mayne as Lion Film Director (uncredited)
 Elsie Tarron as Actress (uncredited)

Actors Billy Bevan and William Desmond appear as themselves. Producer Mack Sennett can be glimpsed briefly as a straw-hatted onlooker at Sue's screen test.

Production
Directed by F. Richard Jones, the film features several shots of semi-rural Southern California (the Edendale area along present-day Glendale Boulevard, where Sennett's studio was located) showing houses and streets of the early 1920s, and of a Hollywood studio in action. One shot in particular, a high-angle view, shows a film set, with actors, two cameras and operators, several production people, and a mood orchestra composed of a pianist and violinist, to set the proper mood for the actors. Another shows an open stage with crew scrambling up scaffolding to the sunlight diffusing panels above.

The Extra Girl was Normand's final feature film and her last film working with producer Sennett.

Survival
Prints of The Extra Girl are held in several archives and it has been released on DVD.

References

External links

Stills at silenthollywood.com
Stills and review at Looking for Mabel Normand

1923 films
1923 comedy films
Silent American comedy films
American silent feature films
American black-and-white films
Films about actors
Films about Hollywood, Los Angeles
Films directed by F. Richard Jones
Films set in Los Angeles
Films shot in Los Angeles
Pathé Exchange films
Associated Exhibitors films
Surviving American silent films
1920s American films